Pia Toscano (born October 14, 1988) is an American singer. Toscano placed ninth on the tenth season of American Idol. In 2016, she released the EP Belong. Her debut album I'm Good was released on October 14, 2022.

Early life
Toscano was born in New York City on October 14, 1988, to Jane and Pat Toscano, and grew up in Howard Beach, Queens. Her father worked as a corporate executive. She is of Italian descent. She began performing in talent shows when she was four and, by the time she was nine, had performed in a local church production of Jesus Christ Superstar. Toscano was the official The Star-Spangled Banner singer at her middle school, P.S./M.S. 207, and performed at every event including graduation. She attended LaGuardia High School of the Performing Arts in New York City and graduated in 2006. Fellow Idol contestant Karen Rodriguez also attended this school.

She performed "The Star-Spangled Banner" and "God Bless America" for the Brooklyn Cyclones, the Mets' minor league team, several times a year for three years. In addition, Toscano was the winner of the New York Mets annual "Anthem Search" competition in 2008 and was selected to sing "The Star-Spangled Banner" at a July 2008 game. Toscano has also opened for the Barenaked Ladies and performed with Josh Groban at Madison Square Garden.

Prior to Idol, Toscano worked as a make-up artist and as a wedding singer in a band called "Current Affair". She cites her musical influences as Mariah Carey, Whitney Houston, Celine Dion, Etta James, and Luther Vandross.

American Idol

Toscano auditioned for Idol four times before. She made it through to Hollywood in season 6, but got cut during the first day of Hollywood. In 2010, she auditioned for the tenth season of American Idol in East Rutherford, New Jersey, and was put through to Hollywood, this time making it through to the Top 24. Toscano was eliminated from the competition on April 7, 2011, finishing in ninth place.

She was considered a frontrunner in the competition, and her elimination shocked judges Randy Jackson, Jennifer Lopez, and Steven Tyler, all three of whom were visibly and vocally upset. Some viewers and media outlets described Toscano's departure as one of the most shocking eliminations in American Idol history. After Idol, Jennifer Lopez
and David Foster helped guide her career.

Performances/results

 Due to the judges using their one save on Casey Abrams, the Top 11 remained intact for another week.

Career
Following her elimination, Toscano appeared on several talk shows. She performed on The Tonight Show with Jay Leno on April 8, Live with Regis and Kelly on April 11, Today on April 12, and The Ellen DeGeneres Show on April 14. She performed "I'll Stand by You" on the April 26, 2011 episode of Dancing with the Stars. On May 25, Toscano appeared on Rachael Ray along with Stefano Langone and Paul McDonald. Toscano performed "The Star-Spangled Banner" and "I'll Stand by You" at the Memorial Day Concert in Washington D.C. on May 29, 2011.
 
The following summer, Toscano toured with the American Idols Live! Tour 2011, which began in West Valley City, Utah on July 6, 2011, and ended in Manila, Philippines on September 20, 2011.

On July 5, 2011, it was announced that Toscano had officially signed with Interscope Records. Her debut single titled "This Time" premiered July 11 and was released digitally on July 13. Toscano performed the single on So You Think You Can Dance on August 4, Good Morning America on August 12, and Live with Regis and Kelly on August 16. Toscano had worked with Rock Mafia on two songs titled "Counterfeit" and "Dreamgirl" for her then-upcoming album.

On September 11, 2011, Toscano performed "God Bless America" at the New York Mets and Chicago Cubs game. In addition, Toscano performed "I'll Stand by You" and "This Time" at the Columbus Day parade in New York City. Toscano performed "The Star-Spangled Banner" at the NASCAR Sprint Cup Series Championship in Miami, Florida on November 20, 2011.

Toscano recorded a duet of "The Christmas Song" with Il Volo for their EP Christmas Favorites, which was released on November 21, 2011. On November 27, 2011, Toscano appeared on Disney Channel's So Random!, where she performed her single "This Time". Toscano also co-wrote the song "Wrecking Ball" with Steven Miller for Aubrey O'Day, which was released on April 23, 2012.

She performed "The Star-Spangled Banner" before every Los Angeles Kings home game in the 2012 Stanley Cup playoffs, in the 2013 Stanley Cup playoffs, the first two rounds of the 2014 Stanley Cup playoffs, game 5 of the 2014 Stanley Cup Finals, before the 2014–15 season opener on October 8, 2014, and before Game 2 of the first round of the 2016 Stanley Cup Playoffs.

On August 7, 2012, it was announced that Toscano met with the showrunners of Glee; however, the role she was auditioning for was re-written at the last minute, but the showrunners were hopeful that she would come back for a different role.

On September 4, 2012, Toscano parted ways with Interscope Records and 19 Management and her debut album that she recorded would not be released. Toscano made her film debut in Grace Unplugged (2013).

On May 30, 2014, Toscano began a six-date summer tour as a background singer for Jennifer Lopez, including appearances on Good Morning America and The Tonight Show Starring Jimmy Fallon.

In 2014, Toscano started a collaborative project 7East with singer-songwriter Jared Lee. A single, "I Don't Believe It", was released on October 7, 2014, with a video released on October 28.

In 2015, her collaboration with DJ/producer Jenaux, "Renegades", was released on Enhanced Music.

Toscano released two singles, "Pyro" and "You'll Be King", on April 7, 2016.

In 2017, Toscano joined David Foster's Hitman Tour as a regular featured performer. In 2018, Toscano was a cast member on Netflix's music reality Westside. In November 2018, Toscano began touring with Andrea Bocelli as a guest performer.

On May 30, 2022, she performed “The Star-Spangled Banner” and “God Bless America” at the 33rd Annual Memorial Day Concert. Her debut album I'm Good is set to be released on October 14, 2022.

Discography

Studio albums

Extended plays

Singles
Lead artist

Featured artist

Music videos

References

External links
Official site
Pia Toscano on American Idol

Pia Toscano discography at Discogs.com

1988 births 
19 Recordings artists
21st-century American singers 
21st-century American women singers
American Idol participants
American people of Italian descent 
Interscope Records artists
Living people
Singers from New York (state)
People from Howard Beach, Queens